Namkoong Min (Hangul: 남궁민, born March 12, 1978) is a South Korean actor, director and screenwriter. He first gained recognition with neo-noir film A Dirty Carnival (2006), and has since received praise for his performances in Remember: War of the Son (2015–2016), Beautiful Gong Shim (2016), Good Manager (2017),  Falsify (2017),  Doctor Prisoner (2019), Hot Stove League (2019–2020), Awaken (2020–2021), The Veil (2021), and One Dollar Lawyer (2022) .

He won the Grand Prize (Daesang) at the 2020 SBS Drama Awards for his performance as Baek Seung-soo in the Hot Stove League. The next year, he won the Grand Prize at the 2021 MBC Drama Awards for his performance in The Veil.

Early life
Namkoong Min was born on March 12, 1978, in Seoul. He has a brother, Namkoong Yoon. His father, Namkoong Hwon, was a principal of Sinneung Middle School (2005-2009). Namkoong was educated at Daesung High School in  Eunpyeong-gu, Seoul, and Ilsan Seongsa Elementary School. He graduated from the Chung-Ang University with a bachelor's degree in Mechanical Engineering. After his graduation on August 31, 2006, he worked as a Social Service Agent for 18 months at Korea Army Training Center in Nonsan.

Career
Namkoong Min debuted as an actor in the film Bungee Jumping of Their Own as the protagonist's best friend, and subsequently appeared in the movie Bad Guy as the female lead's boyfriend. In 2002, Namkoong featured in the sitcom Dae Bak Family and attracted attention with his performance. Since then, he appeared in the television series and single-act dramas such as Rose Fence, Pearl Necklace, Mould Flower and After Love. Namkoong also became known as "little Bae Yong-joon" due to his resemblance with the actor. In 2004, Namkoong starred in the KBS daily drama My Lovely Family, which garnered over 30% in ratings and led to increased recognition for the actor.

Namkoong subsequently received acclaim with neo-noir film A Dirty Carnival (2006), and drew widespread notice for his performance in melodrama Listen to My Heart (2011).
Namkoong subsequently returned with a changed mindset and new-found determination. His efforts paid off when he achieved recognition for his villainous role as a serial killer in The Girl Who Sees Smells (2015), and he won the Best Villain Award at the annual 2016 DramaFever Awards. Since then, he has received praise for his performances in legal thriller Remember: War of the Son (2015–2016) and romantic comedy Beautiful Gong Shim (2016).

Namkoong's breakout role was in the hit comedy drama Good Manager (2017), where he played the central protagonist. Namkoong was praised for his "perfect amalgamation of character creation and acting" which contributed to the success of the drama. He then starred in SBS's legal thriller Falsify (2017), playing a trashy tabloid reporter with no work ethics.

In 2018, Namkoong starred alongside Listen to My Heart co-star Hwang Jung-eum in the romantic comedy series The Undateables.

In 2019, Namkoong starred in the medical prison drama Doctor Prisoner.

From 2019 to 2020, Namkoong starred in the sports television series Hot Stove League. The television series received positive reviews for its high quality script and attained high ratings. He played the role of the new leader of the last-place team, the Dreams. Hot Stove League won 56th Baeksang Arts Awards 2020 for best drama. Through that drama, he also received his first daesang/grand prize in his career from 2020 SBS Drama Awards.

In September 2021, Namkoong decided to renew his contract with 935 Entertainment. This is the third contract renewal.

Personal life
Namkoong has been in a relationship with model Jin Ah-reum since late 2015, who he met while filming movie Light My Fire as a director and actress. They married in a private ceremony on October 7, 2022, at Hotel Shilla in Seoul. The ceremony was attended by the couple's closest family and friends, including actors Jung Moon-sung as host, and TVXQ performed the congratulatory song.

Other activities

Endorsements
On February 6, 2023, Namkoong introduced as the new model of WELLMADE, a fashion editing shop.

Filmography

Film

Television series

Television shows

Hosting

Music video appearances

Awards and nominations

State honors

Notes

References

External links

 
 
 

 

Male actors from Seoul
South Korean male film actors
South Korean male television actors
South Korean male models
Chung-Ang University alumni
1978 births
Living people
21st-century South Korean male actors
Hamyeol Namgung clan